The 5th Screen Actors Guild Awards, honoring the best achievements in film and television performances for the year 1998, took place on March 7, 1999. The ceremony was held at the Shrine Exposition Center in Los Angeles, California, and was televised live by TNT.

The nominees were announced on January 26, 1999 by Salma Hayek and David Hyde Pierce.

Winners and nominees
Winners are listed first and highlighted in boldface.

Screen Actors Guild Life Achievement Award
 Kirk Douglas

Film

Television

In Memoriam
Michael Douglas presented the film clip to the members of the guild who died in the last year: 

 Robert Allen
 Gene Autry
 Binnie Barnes
 Lloyd Bridges
 Dane Clark
 Iron Eyes Cody
 Danny Dayton
 John Derek
 Alice Faye
 Norman Fell
 Douglas Fowley
 Mary Frann
 Huntz Hall
 Phil Hartman
 Hurd Hatfield
 Irene Hervey
 Josephine Hutchinson
 Leonid Kinskey
 Phil Leeds
 Shari Lewis
 Joseph Maher
 E. G. Marshall
 Daniel Massey
 Ferdy Mayne
 Roddy McDowall
 Theresa Merritt
 Jeanette Nolan
 Maidie Norman
 Dick O'Neill
 Leo Penn
 Maureen O'Sullivan
 Roy Rogers
 Esther Rolle
 Frank Sinatra
 Susan Strasberg
 Don Taylor
 Michelle Thomas
 Bobby Troup
 J. T. Walsh
 O. Z. Whitehead
 Flip Wilson
 Robert Young
 Michael Zaslow

References

External links
 The 5th Annual Screen Actors Guild Awards

1998
1998 film awards
1998 television awards
Screen
Screen Actors Guild
Screen
March 1999 events in the United States